The 1901 Syracuse Orangemen football team was an American football team that represented Syracuse University as an independent during the 1901 college football season. In its second season under head coach Edwin Sweetland, the team compiled a 7–1 record. Lynn Wycoff was the team captain.

Schedule

References

Syracuse
Syracuse Orange football seasons
Syracuse Orangemen football